Beaver Field at Jim and Bettie Smith Stadium is a baseball stadium in Boone, North Carolina, that is home to the Appalachian State baseball program. Prior to using Beaver Field, the Mountaineers used Lackey Field. The stadium was dedicated on April 10, 2007, with the Mountaineers claiming a 6–1 victory over Gardner-Webb. Appalachian selected AstroTurf as the playing surface for the new stadium, joining a select group of NCAA Division I and MLB programs to use the mix of silica sand and cryogenic rubber to emulate natural grass. The stadium has been mentioned in national publications for its beauty, especially during the fall season.

The stadium has seating for 1,000, including grandstands behind home plate, grass seating along the first base line, and fire pits that seat 4-6 people in the outfield. The student section at Smith Stadium is located in the grandstands on the first base side. 

In addition to Beaver Field, Smith Stadium is also home to Beaver Clubhouse, Don and Pat Phillips Indoor Hitting Facility, and a press box.

See also
 List of NCAA Division I baseball venues

References

External links
 Jim and Bettie Smith Stadium at GoASU

Appalachian State Mountaineers baseball
College baseball venues in the United States
Baseball venues in North Carolina
Sports venues in Watauga County, North Carolina
2007 establishments in North Carolina
Sports venues completed in 2007